Högestad Castle is  an estate in Ystad Municipality in Scania, Sweden.

History 
During the Middle Ages, the estate was owned by the Archbishop of Lund.
In 1635 it was owned by Danish statesman Palle Rosenkrantz (1587-1642)  who built the main building, a two-story stone house with stairwells.  Carl Piper (1647-1716) and his wife Christina Piper (1673–1752 bought the estate in 1706.

See also
List of castles in Sweden

References

External links
Högestad & Christinehof website

Buildings and structures in Skåne County